Craig Morgan is the debut album by the American country music singer of the same name. Released in 2000 as his only album for the Atlantic Records label, it produced the singles "Paradise", "I Want Us Back", and "Something to Write Home About", which peaked at number 39 on the U.S. country charts. "Everything's a Thing" was later recorded by Joe Nichols (who co-wrote the song as well) on his 2003 album Man with a Memory.

Track listing

Personnel
Melonie Cannon – background vocals
Steve Cropper – electric guitar
Merle Haggard – duet vocals on "I Wish I Could See Bakersfield"
Rob Hajacos – fiddle
Randy Hardison – drums, percussion
Ted Hewitt – background vocals
John Hobbs – keyboards
Jim Horn – baritone saxophone
John Jorgenson – electric guitar
B. James Lowry – electric guitar, acoustic guitar
Craig Morgan – lead vocals
Larry Paxton – bass guitar
Charles Rose – trombone

Chart performance

Singles

References

External links
[ Allmusic entry]

2000 debut albums
Atlantic Records albums
Craig Morgan albums
Albums produced by Buddy Cannon
Albums produced by Norro Wilson